3rd NSFC Awards
January 1969

Best Picture: 
 Shame 

The 3rd National Society of Film Critics Awards, given by the National Society of Film Critics in January 1969, honored the best in film for 1968.

Winners

Best Picture 
1. Shame (Skammen)
2. Faces
3. Weekend

Best Director 
Ingmar Bergman – Shame (Skammen) and Hour of the Wolf (Vargtimmen)

Best Actor 
Per Oscarsson – Hunger (Sult)

Best Actress 
Liv Ullmann – Shame (Skammen)

Best Supporting Actor 
Seymour Cassel – Faces

Best Supporting Actress 
Billie Whitelaw – Charlie Bubbles

Best Screenplay 
John Cassavetes – Faces

Best Cinematography 
William A. Fraker – Bullitt

Special Award (for feature-length documentary) 
A Face of War
Warrendale

Special Award (for feature-length animation) 
Yellow Submarine

References

External links
Past Awards

National Society of Film Critics Awards
1968
National Society of Film Critics Awards
National Society of Film Critics Awards